The 1820 United States presidential election in South Carolina took place between November 1 to December 6, 1820, as part of the 1820 United States presidential election. The state legislature chose 11 representatives, or electors to the Electoral College, who voted for President and Vice President.

During this election, South Carolina cast its 11 electoral votes to Democratic Republican candidate and incumbent President James Monroe.

Effectively, the 1820 presidential election was an election with no campaign, since there was no serious opposition to Monroe and Tompkins. In fact, they won all the electoral votes barring one from New Hampshire, which was cast for Secretary of State John Quincy Adams.

References

South Carolina
1820
1820 South Carolina elections